Maebong Station is a station on the Seoul Subway Line 3. It is located in Dogok-dong, Gangnam-gu, Seoul and was named after the nearby Maebongsan mountain.

Station layout

Vicinity
Exit 1 : Dogok Park
Exit 2 : Maebong Tunnel, SK Leaders View APT
Exit 3 : AsungDaiso, Hanshin APT, Yangjaecheon Stream
Exit 4 : Daechi Middle School, Gaepo Lucky APT

References 

Metro stations in Gangnam District
Seoul Metropolitan Subway stations
Railway stations opened in 1993
Seoul Subway Line 3